Afghanistan competed at the 1960 Summer Olympics in Rome.

Athletics

Wrestling

References
Olympic Games Official Report 1960 Rome-Volume I
Olympic Games Official Report 1960 Rome-Volume II (Part 1)

Nations at the 1960 Summer Olympics
1960
1960 in Afghan sport